Lockport Township may refer to the following places in the United States:

 Lockport Township, Will County, Illinois
 Lockport Township, Haskell County, Kansas
 Lockport Township, St. Joseph County, Michigan

See also 
 Lockport (disambiguation)

Township name disambiguation pages